The Democratic Korea Party (DKP) was a political party in South Korea.

History
The DKP was established on 17 January 1981 following a meeting of fourteen former members of the New Democratic Party on 22 November 1980. Yu Chi-song was elected party president, and its candidate for the February 1981 presidential elections, in which he finished second to the incumbent president Chun Doo-hwan.

In the March 1981 parliamentary elections the DKP received 21.6% of the vote, winning 81 seats and emerging as the second-largest party to Chun's Democratic Justice Party. The party was widely perceived as being under the control of the Chun Doo-hwan's government to preserve the pretense of democratic competition between parties. The party was not recognised by Kim Dae-jung and Kim Young-sam as they both were barred from running elections. 

In the 1985 elections the party was reduced to 35 seats. The party received just 0.2% of the vote in the 1988 elections, failing to win a seat. It was subsequently deregistered on 29 April 1988.

Election results

Legislature

References

Defunct political parties in South Korea
Democratic parties in South Korea
Liberal conservative parties
Conservative liberal parties
1981 establishments in South Korea
Political parties established in 1981
Korean nationalist parties